Agelenin, also called U1-agatoxin-Aop1a, is an antagonist of the presynaptic P-type calcium channel in insects. This neurotoxic peptide consists of 35 amino acids and can be isolated from the venom of the spider Allagelena opulenta.

Sources
Agelenin - toxicologically named as U1-agatoxin-Aop1a and abbreviated as U1-AGTX-Aop1a - is an insecticidal toxin of the venom of the species Allagelena opulenta. It was first discovered in 1990.

Chemistry
Agelenin consists of a polypeptide chain of 35 amino acid residues. It has a short anti-parallel β-sheet connected by three disulfide bonds and four β-turns that form the compact core structure. The three amino acid residues that are thought to be essential for the inhibiting activity of agelenin are Phe9, Ser28 and Arg33.

The structure of agelenin is similar to the structure of ICK toxins like ω-Aga-IVA and ω-ACTXHv1a in that they all consist of three disulfide bonds with the same bonding pattern. An important difference between agelenin and  ω-Aga-IVA and ω-ACTXHv1a  is that  ω-Aga-IVA and ω-ACTXHv1a  have functional C-terminal tails.

Agelenin belongs to toxin group of Agatoxins. The amino acid structure of agelenin is Gly-Gly-Cys-Leu-Pro-His-Asn-Arg-Phe-Cys-Asn-Ala-Leu-Ser-Gly-Pro-Arg-Cys-Cys-Ser-Gly-Leu-Lys-Cys-Lys-Glu-Leu-Ser-Ile-Trp-Asp-Ser-Arg-Cys-Leu (GGCLPHNRFCNALSGPRCCSGLKCKELSIWDSRCL).

Target
Agelenin is directed against P-subtype calcium channels in insects.

Toxicity
Agelenin is not toxic in mammals, but has a PD50 of 291 pmol/g in crickets where it causes rapid, reversible paralysis. In preparations of neuromuscular junctions of lobsters agelenin causes a non-reversible paralysis due to the suppression of excitatory postsynaptic potentials, presumably by inhibition of the presynaptic calcium influx.

References

Neurotoxins
Ion channel toxins
Spider toxins